Aerostar Airlines is a business jet charter service based in Kyiv, Ukraine. Flight operations started in 1997.

Fleet 
 1 Beechcraft King Air 350
 1 Cessna Citation Mustang
 1 Cessna Citation XLS
 1 Dassault Falcon 20
 1 Dassault Falcon 2000
 1 Dassault Falcon 900
 3 Dornier 328JET

Airlines of Ukraine
Ukrainian companies established in 1997
Airlines established in 1997